Neverlia is a small farm area in Elverum Municipality in Innlandet county, Norway. The principal industries of Neverlia are farming and forestry.

References

Elverum
Villages in Innlandet